Sivensa (BVC: SVS) is the second largest Venezuelan steel producer. Sidor, which was nationalized in 2008, is the largest.  However, Sivensa, founded in 1948, has been Venezuela's largest steel producer in the private-sector as of 2008.

History 
The corporate documents for Siderúrgica Venezolana, S.A., were registered in October 1948.  The company was started with capital of two million bolívars; its largest founding shareholder was Miles Meyer Sherover (1896–1976), an Israeli-American.  Other founding shareholders included Robert Turgot Brinsmade (1913–1994), an American international lawyer, Warren William Smith (1865–1956), a U.S. citizen, Oscar Augusto Machado (1890–1966), a Venezuelan, and Carlos Morales, a Venezuelan.  Its founding objective was to produce steel rebar, wire rods, structures, and other steel products.

The first cast by Sivensa was in 1950, and that year, the company reached a production capacity of five tons per year. In 1956, Sherover became President, a position he held until 1959, when Oscar Machado Zuloaga took over. Angel Cervini replaced him until 1979.

By 1957, the Antímano plant in Caracas was producing 65,000 tons of steel rebar using obsolete machinery and equipment.  That year, Sivensa acquired a 50% stake in Recuperadora General
Venezolana C.A. (Regeveca), which bought and sold scrap metal in the country.

In 1998, Sivensa suffered a substantial crisis — mainly due to the Asian crisis — which reduced the size of the company and generated a substantial debt. Has one main division, International Briquettes Holding (IBH), which sells briquettes and iron pellets.

In 2010, the Venezuelan government expropriated Sivensa's largest and most important subsidiary, Sidetur, which sells steel.  After higher steel prices improved the financial situation following the Asian crisis, the government nationalized Sidetur. The plants, those still owned by Sivensa and those that were expropriated, are all located in Venezuela.  Nine operating plants are located in the states of Bolívar, Carabobo, Miranda, Lara, and the Federal District.  Additionally, Sidetur has 14 ferrous material collection centers located in various cities.

See also
 List of Venezuelan companies
 Siderúrgica del Turbio S.A. (Sidetur)

References 
Notes

Inline citations

External links
 SIVENSA Webpage

Steel companies of Venezuela
Companies listed on the Caracas Stock Exchange
Manufacturing companies established in 1948
1948 establishments in Venezuela